Belnet (the Belgian National research and education network) is a Belgian internet provider for educational institutions, research centres, scientific institutes and government services. Since 1993, BELNET provides web services to higher education, federal departments and ministries, and international organisations.

Since 2001, Belnet provides IPv6 connectivity and multicast access to its customers.

One of Belnet's FTP servers is a mirror for holding several files related to the FOSS and GNU communities, as well as Linux distros such as Ubuntu, Debian, Gentoo, and Fedora.

Since 2004, Belnet is the operator of BEgrid, the Belgian research grid infrastructure, and since 2009 it is also the operator of the BEgrid Portal (based on P-GRADE Portal technology).

On 4 and 5 May 2021, Belnet was subject to a massive DDOS attack that disrupted the accessibility of websites using the .be domain, including those of the Belgian government, parliament, police, educational and research institutions, health care, and public broadcasters, forcing the postponement of parliamentary hearings relating to the Uyghur genocide.

References

External links

Cisco et BELNET accélèrent le trafic Internet belge
BELNET développe les services de protection informatique
Gridguide : BELNET
BEGrid
BEmads
P-GRADE Portal

Internet in Belgium
Internet mirror services
Internet service providers of Belgium
National research and education networks